"Run" is a song from Australian alternative rock group, George. It was released as the second single taken from their debut studio album Polyserena (2002).

Track listing
 CD Single (020522) 
 "Run" - 4:09
 "Holiday"  (Live @ The Metro)  - 5:00
 "That's When You Come To Me"  (Live @ Roma Street Parklands)  - 4:02

Weekly charts

Personnel
 Bass - Paul B
 Drums - Geoff Green
 Guitar - Nick Stewart
 Vox/ Keys - Tyronne Noonan
 Vox/ Keys - Katie Noonan

References

George (band) songs
2001 songs
2001 singles